Juliet Holness (née Landell) is the wife of Jamaican Prime Minister Andrew Holness and a Member of the House of Representatives, representing Saint Andrew East Rural.

Holness is a motivational speaker, real estate owner, agent, accountant and writer. She was born and raised in St. Catherine, Jamaica.

Early life
In 1997 she married Andrew Holness, whom she had met as a student at St. Catherine High School during the 1980s.

Political career 
Holness was elected to Parliament in 2016, and was re-elected in 2020.

References

http://www.jamaicaobserver.com/news/The-PM-s-wife

Living people
Year of birth missing (living people)
Members of the House of Representatives of Jamaica
21st-century Jamaican women politicians
21st-century Jamaican politicians
Spouses of prime ministers of Jamaica
People from Saint Catherine Parish
Members of the 14th Parliament of Jamaica